The 2000 UCI Track Cycling World Cup Classics is a multi race tournament over a season of track cycling. The season ran from 19 May 2000 to 13 August 2000. The World Cup is organised by the UCI.

Results

Men

Women

References
Round 1, Moscow (Results archived on June 9, 2010)
Round 2, Cali (Results archived on June 9, 2010)
Round 3, Mexico (Results archived on June 9, 2010)
Round 4, Turin (Results archived on June 9, 2010)
Round 5, Ipoh (Results archived on June 9, 2010)

World Cup Classics
UCI Track Cycling World Cup